Gongylomorphus borbonicus was a small species of skink, a lizard in the family Scincidae. The species was endemic to Réunion.

References

External links
Reptile Database - Gongylomorphus borbonicus.

Gongylomorphus
Reptiles of Mauritius
Reptiles described in 1969